USA October 2005 is an EP by Jens Lekman, which was self-released on his United States tour in October 2005.

Track listing
Run Away With Me (Previously Unreleased Christmas Single)
How Much You Mean To Me
Me On the Beach (Nagisa Ni Te cover)
Jag tyckte hon sa lönnlöv (Swedish version of "Maple Leaves")

2005 EPs
Jens Lekman EPs
Self-released EPs